The Mars Desert Research Station (MDRS) is the largest and longest-running Mars surface research facility and is one of two simulated Mars analog habitats owned and operated by the Mars Society.

The MDRS station was built in the early 2000s near Hanksville, Utah, in the western United States. It is crewed by small teams who conduct scientific research.

The MDRS campus includes a two-story habitat with a greenhouse, a solar and a robotic observatory, an engineering pod and a science building.

Background 
The MDRS station is situated on the San Rafael Swell of Southern Utah,  by road northwest of Hanksville, Utah. It is the second such analogue research station to be built by the Mars Society, following the Flashline Mars Arctic Research Station or FMARS on Devon Island in Canada's high Arctic.

The third station, the European Mars Analog Research Station, or EuroMARS, was founded and built in early 2002.

The Mars Society launched the Mars Analog Research Station Project with the stated goal of developing knowledge needed to prepare for the human exploration of Mars. The project's goals are to develop field tactics based on environmental constraints (i.e., being required to work in spacesuits), test habitat design features and tools, and assess crew selection protocols. Although much warmer than Mars, the desert location was selected because of its Mars-like terrain and appearance.

The MDRS aims to realistically simulate Mars living conditions. During mission periods, crew members must wear an analogue space suit simulator when completing tasks outside their living quarters, which is a metal building with an airlock. Analogue space suit simulators include a helmet, jumpsuit, boots, gaiters, gloves, an air supply pack, water pack, and a radio. Hand-held radios mounted on the suits' helmets with externally mounted push-to-talk northeast switches are used to communicate with the Habitat and with fellow Mars surface explorers on the same extra-vehicular activity (EVA). 

Destinations for EVAs can be chosen from an established way-point database, and attained either on foot, or by all-terrain vehicle.

MDRS is owned and operated by the Mars Society, which selects the crews and handles most of the administrative tasks. The Mars Society is an international, non-profit organization that works with governments to promote Mars exploration through various projects such as M.A.R.S., the Mars Analogue Pressurized Rover Competition, and the ARCHIMEDES Mars balloon mission.

The MDRS hosts a training program funded by NASA which hosts teachers to participate in projects meant to simulate the living environment on the moon or Mars. In this program, participants conduct field research and live onsite for several weeks.

Research
Each crew establishes different scientific goals they hope to accomplish during their time at MDRS. The majority of biological research involves extremophiles. Bacteria and algae isolated from the surrounding desert are common subjects of study. These microorganisms have been studied for their DNA, their diversity, and the environments in which they thrive. For example, in a study for methanogens, researchers studied soil and vapor samples from five different desert environments in Utah, Idaho, and California in the United States, Canada, and Chile. Of these, five soil samples and three vapor samples from the vicinity of the MDRS were found to have signs of viable methanogens.

Crews often study endoliths found in rocks at the MDRS. These species of bacteria are capable of living inside rocks and obtaining the energy they need by photosynthesizing the light that penetrates the rocks. These extreme organisms are a popular subject of research at MDRS for both geologists and biologists.

Other experiments include a study of the effect of extra-vehicular activity (EVA) on the heart rates and blood pressures of crew members, a human-factors study that examines the correlation between cognitive ability and mood, and a study on how much a space suit inhibits dexterity in comparison to regular street clothes.

Crews

MDRS crews traditionally consist of six people who volunteer for one of the two-week shifts or crew rotations available during the northern hemisphere's winter months. The field season ends in the northern spring due to the desert heat. Crews pay their own transportation expenses to and from the designated assembly place from where they are transported to and from MDRS. As volunteers, the crews are not paid for their participation in a crew rotation at the station. The crews usually consist of a mix of scientists, astronomers, physicists, biologists, geologists, engineers, and the occasional journalist. Each crew member is usually assigned a role, such as: commander, executive officer, health and safety officer, crew biologist, crew geologist or chief engineer.

Crew commanders are responsible for the entire crew and operations. Their responsibilities include maintaining a structured stream of information from the crew to mission support, establishing the agenda for each day (EVAs, maintenance, cooking, cleaning, etc.), and holding morning and evening meetings with all crew members. The executive officer's duty is to act as the second in command during the mission, and to act as the commander in the event the commander is incapacitated or unavailable. The crew geologist and crew biologist work together to establish and accomplish the scientific goals of the mission, which include developing the geology and biology goals for the mission as well as planning field EVAs and subsequent laboratory work to achieve those goals. Both the crew geologist and crew biologist work with the remote science team (RST) during all stages of the mission. The Chief Engineer is responsible for maintaining all systems necessary for routine Habitat operations. These include the power, water, ATV and GreenHab systems.

,175 crews have served rotations at MDRS over a period of sixteen years.

The Research Station

The research station consists of three buildings: the Habitat ("Hab"), the GreenHab, the Musk Mars Desert Observatory and a remotely located Engineering Support Equipment Area.

Habitat
On the first floor, are two simulated airlocks, a shower and toilet, an EVA Preparation room for storage and maintenance of the simulated space suits and their associated equipment, and a combined science lab and engineering work area. The laboratory is shared between the crew geologist and the crew biologist and includes an autoclave, analytical balance, microscope, and a stock of chemicals and reagents for conducting biochemical tests. 

On the second floor are six very small private crew staterooms with bunks and a small reading desk, a common dining and entertainment area, a dedicated communications station and a galley or kitchen equipped with a gas stove, refrigerator, microwave, oven and a sink for meal preparations. Above the six crew staterooms is a Loft which contains the internal freshwater storage tank and equipment storage space. At the peak of the HAB's dome-shaped roof is an access hatch to permit maintenance access to the satellite antenna and weather monitoring instruments.

Power is supplied by 12 rechargeable 24-volt batteries located under the Hab which can provide electrical power for up to twelve hours. In addition to the batteries are two  electricity generators. Power from the generators is channeled through an inverter, which sends the power either to the battery banks to recharge them or via a panel with 19 circuit breakers, to the HAB electrical distribution system.

The water is then gravity fed into a pressure pump that distributes the freshwater to the rest of the HAB, including a water heater. The water used to flush toilets is greywater. This is wastewater that has run down the sink and shower drains in the HAB and then through the greywater system out of the GreenHab. Water is rationed and monitored to minimize inefficiency and waste in the system.

The Hab is also equipped with an internet connection and several webcams so that the public can view the ongoing mission.

GreenHab
The GreenHab is a greenhouse used for growing crops and plant research. The original Gary Fisher GreenHab, retrofitted in 2009 from a closed loop water recycling center to a functional greenhouse, was destroyed by fire in December 2014, and replaced in September 2015 after an Indiegogo campaign raised $12,540 to rebuild it.

Originally the rebuilt GreenHab was planned as a geodesic dome, however, once the pad and frame were in place, it could not be made wind and winter-tight, so it was completed as the new Science Dome. The new Greenhab is a 12-foot by 24 foot transparent building that is climate and light controlled. Plants grown in the GreenHab are mostly herbs, greens, radishes, tomatoes, and other vegetables.

Musk Mars Desert Observatory

The Musk Mars Desert Observatory houses a  Schmidt-Cassegrain telescope, donated by Celestron. The telescope is capable of being operated remotely, and is accessible to amateur and professional astronomers via the internet. The observatory's other sponsors include Le Sueur Manufacturing Inc., which provided the Astro-Pier on which the telescope is mounted; Software Bisque, which provided TheSky software; Vince Lanzetta of East Coast Observatories; Adirondack Video Astronomy; High Point Scientific; Technical Innovations; and the Lehigh Valley Amateur Astronomical Association.

The addition of the Musk Mars Desert Observatory provides research opportunities that were not available before, to the crew and local teachers and students. Students and teachers are invited to interact with the crew and to use the observatory as a learning tool.

Engineering tasks are completed in the repair and assembly module, a retrofitted Chinook helicopter fuel compartment designed for tool storage, and work spaces for engineering projects and repair of station instruments. It was moved to the campus in October 2017 and became fully operational in November 2018.

Other
North of the GreenHab is the underground septic tank and its outflow field. This area is a "No Drive  Foot Traffic Only Zone" as there is no record of where exactly the septic tank is buried. East of the GreenHab is an omnidirectional Jovian radio telescope.

MDRS is the site of the annual University Rover Challenge, the first of which was held on June 2, 2007.

The Flag of Mars appears on a couple of the buildings, as does the Flag of the United States.

See also
 Flashline Mars Arctic Research Station
 BYU Mars Rover
 Colonization of Mars
 Exploration of Mars
 Flag of Mars
 Haughton-Mars Project
 Life on Mars
 Human mission to Mars
 MARS-500
 Mars Direct
 Mars to Stay
 Moon Society
 Space colonization
 Space science
 Timekeeping on Mars

References

External links

Mars Society Desert Research Station website
About the Mars Analog Research Program
MDRS Expedition Guide: Detailed guide for MDRS crew members
MDRS article in ''Popular Science
Space Daily: MDRS Completes First Crew Rotation

Buildings and structures in Wayne County, Utah
Science and technology in the United States
Human analog missions
Brigham Young University
Space farming
Mars Society